Chersotis oreina is a moth of the family Noctuidae. It is found in Western Alps (France, Switzerland and Italy) and in Pyrenees (Spain), at about 2000 m. a.s.l. It is very similar to Chersotis alpestris, but this species has no tuft of black hair at the base of the abdomen and the upper dots on the wings are elliptical or rectangular, while in C. alpestris they are round. The wingspan is about 30 mm. The moth flies from July to September.

External links
Fauna Europaea
Biolib
www.nic.funet.fi
www.lepiforum.de
Lepinet.fr

Noctuinae
Moths described in 1984
Moths of Europe